François Deley (born 27 March 1956) is a Belgian former butterfly, freestyle and medley swimmer. He competed at the 1972 Summer Olympics and the 1976 Summer Olympics.

References

External links
 

1956 births
Living people
Belgian male butterfly swimmers
Belgian male freestyle swimmers
Belgian male medley swimmers
Olympic swimmers of Belgium
Swimmers at the 1972 Summer Olympics
Swimmers at the 1976 Summer Olympics
Sportspeople from Ostend